The South Fork Breitenbush River is a  tributary of the Breitenbush River in the U.S. state of Oregon. The river flows generally northwest from Russell Lake in the Mount Jefferson Wilderness of the Cascade Range to near Breitenbush Hot Springs, where it merges with the North Fork Breitenbush River to form the main stem.

The South Fork receives Lake Creek and Roaring Creek, both from the right, as it descends through the wilderness and the Willamette National Forest. From the confluence of its forks, the main stem Breitenbush River flows about  further to its confluence with the North Santiam River in Detroit Lake.

Recreation
The Pacific Crest Trail crosses the South Fork near Russell Lake.

South Breitenbush Gorge Trail, along the river closer to its confluence with the main stem, passes through older Douglas-fir and western hemlock forest.

See also
 List of rivers of Oregon

References

Rivers of Marion County, Oregon
Rivers of Oregon